Siddhachalam is the first Jain Tirtha (pilgrimage site) located outside of India. Founded in 1983 by Sushil Kumar, it is located on a 108-acre (44ha) site in rural New Jersey, United States. Siddhachalam (Hindi: siddha, liberated souls; achal, a permanent place, as a mountain) literally means the abode of liberated souls.

History
In 1980, Sushil Kumar encouraged his disciples to acquire a long-abandoned children's summer camp and founded an ashram there to teach ahimsa. Kumar reportedly engaged there in extended samadhi meditation. Twelve years later, he encouraged the community to establish temples in homage to Jinas. The ashram maintains the only Jain monastery outside India. Siddhachalam has become an important center of Jain conferences and an important Jain pilgrimage. The center houses idols from all Jain sects, given that American Jains have sought to not bring in sectarian differences from India.

In 2012, Siddhachalam became the site for the world's first full-scale, complete replication of Shikharji, the most important place of pilgrimage for the Jains. Shikharji at Siddhachalam is the first Jain place of pilgrimage outside India.

The main temple has  marble idols of the tirthankaras Rishabha, Pārśva, Mahāvīra, Chandraprabha and Shantinatha. There is also a small temple where the main idol is Pārśva.

The ashram is also a nature preserve and wildlife sanctuary.

See also

 Brampton Jain Temple
 Jainism in the United States

References

Citations

Sources

External links
 Siddhachalam Jain Tirth

20th-century Jain temples
Indian-American culture in New Jersey
Jain temples in the United States
Temples in New Jersey
Religious organizations established in 1983